A Lady Mislaid is a 1958 British comedy film directed by David MacDonald and starring Phyllis Calvert, Alan White and Thorley Walters. It is based on a 1948 play of the same name by Kenneth Horne.

Plot
Esther, (Phyllis Calvert), and her sister Jennifer, (Gillian Owen), are spinsters. Esther has bought a remote country cottage, and has invited her novelist sister to stay for recuperation.
Esther hasn't told Jennifer that a policeman, (Alan White), had called, earlier, had explained that the police wanted to search the house and gardens for the body of the former owner's wife, and that she'd agreed. When a human skeleton is unearthed in the chicken coop, the finger of suspicion points firmly at the previous occupant, Mr. Smith (Thorley Walters).

Cast
Phyllis Calvert as Esther Williams
Alan White as Det. Sgt. Bullock
Thorley Walters as Smith
Gillian Owen as Jennifer
Richard Leech as George
Constance Fraser as Mrs. Small
Sheila Shand Gibbs as Betty

Critical reception
The Radio Times gave the film two out of five stars, and wrote, "A quaint idea and a decent cast make perfectly respectable entertainment out of an hour-long British programmer, but there's not much more to be said for it."

References

External links

1958 films
1958 comedy films
British black-and-white films
British comedy films
British films based on plays
Films directed by David MacDonald (director)
Films shot at Associated British Studios
1950s English-language films
1950s British films